The E. R. Meres Sponge Packing House is a historic site in Tarpon Springs, Florida. It is located at 106 West Park Street. On April 10, 1991, it was added to the U.S. National Register of Historic Places.

See also
 N. G. Arfaras Sponge Packing House

References

External links
 Pinellas County listings at National Register of Historic Places
 Pinellas County listings at Florida's Office of Cultural and Historical Programs

National Register of Historic Places in Pinellas County, Florida
Buildings and structures in Tarpon Springs, Florida
Sponge diving